The Calcare di Altamura (Italian for Altamura Limestone) is a Coniacian to early Campanian geologic formation in Italy. The formation comprises limestones that are highly fractured, in places karstified and dolomitized. Fossil ankylosaur tracks have been reported from the formation.

Description 
The Calcare di Altamura overlies the Calcare di Bari, separated by an unconformity and is overlain by the Calcare di Caranna, separated by a transgressive angular unconformity. The Calcare di Altamura is subdivided into the Loferitique, Stromatolique and Gorjanovicia Members. The formation comprises limestones with some levels of dolomitization. The succession starts with a sequence of stromatolites and is heavily fractured and karstified. The formation crops out south of the Bari–Taranto railway. The lower part of the formation is dated to the Coniacian based on the presence of the microfossils Aeolisaccus kotori, Thaumatoporella parvovesiculifera, Accordiella conica and Moncharmontia appenninica. The upper part is dated to the early Campanian.

Fossil content 
The formation has provided ichnofossils of:
 Apulosauripus federicianus
 Ankylosauria indet.

See also 
 Dinosaur Quarry of Altamura
 List of fossiliferous stratigraphic units in Italy
 List of dinosaur-bearing rock formations
 List of stratigraphic units with ornithischian tracks
 Ankylosaur tracks

References

Bibliography 
 
  
 
 
 

Geologic formations of Italy
Upper Cretaceous Series of Europe
Cretaceous Italy
Campanian Stage
Coniacian Stage
Santonian Stage
Limestone formations
Dolomite formations
Shallow marine deposits
Reef deposits
Ichnofossiliferous formations
Paleontology in Italy
Formations